Supertorpe (Spanish for"Superclumsy") is an Argentinian series targeted at children and teenagers. The show is distributed worldwide by Disney Channel and Telefe Internacional, and locally by Telefe. Candela Vetrano and Pablo Martínez took starring roles.

Plot
Poli Truper (Candela Vetrano) is a 16-year-old girl. She is a seemingly ordinary teenager but with a special gift: she is super powerful and equally clumsy. Poli has the misfortune of losing control of her powers whenever she gets nervous or gives vent to her feelings, which gets her in trouble constantly, especially at school.

She is actually "Super T", (Super Truper), but, being too clumsy, people call her "Super Clumsy" and it annoys her that people call her like that. Poli knows the possibilities that her powers could give her, but fails to dominate them. Thus, her clumsiness will unleash several disasters, as freezing all her school classmates wanting to stop time in a happy moment, getting caught on the wall with half body inside and half body outside when she tries to teleport from one room to another, or leave the school principal deaf for a few minutes when she sings a song with her super squeaky voice. Fortunately, her brother Filo – whose only super power is to be unbearably clever – is always responsible for covering the destructions that Poli produces with her bungling and avoid that her secret gift is discovered.

The only place where Poli feels in control of her powers is in her dreams, where not only she manages to master them to perfection but also makes it while wearing her glamorous superhero costume. In addition, in her dream world she sings as the gods and manages to conquer Felix (Pablo Martínez), her class companion whom which she's madly in love with. With the help of her brother, her best friend Mia and her Chinese nanny Chin Chan – who is, in fact, a professional trainer of superheroes – Poli will attempt to learn how to master her powers to become the superheroine that she is intended to be and fight against evil, as she muddles through the ups and downs of adolescence and the challenge of growing up.

Characters

Main characters

Main 
 Candela Vetrano as Poli Truper / Super T.
 Pablo Martinez as Felix Tarner
 Olivia Viggiano as Mia Nichols
 Facundo Parolari as Filo Truper
 Chen Min as Chin Chan

Side 
 Lourdes Mansilla as Anita.
 Pía Uribelarrea as Miss Thorn.
 Fabian Pizzorno as Rafael Tarner.
 Adriana Salonia as Gloria Truper.
 Nicole Luis as Mora (starting from the second season).

Guest stars 
 Sofía Reca as Michi (first season, episode: "The substitute").
 Rocío Igarzábal as Lucia (second season, episode: "mission impossible: singing").

Episodes

Season 1

Súper Bonus 
Segment dedicated to the backstage of the recordings and notes with the actors of the Strip. It intended that viewers could meet the players beyond their characters. This segment was the actor Stéfano de Gregorio as a driver.

Videoclips 
The 4 July 2011 during the segment of the "Zapping Zone" by Disney Channel, premiered the first videoclip for the song "for you", sung by Candela Vetrano.

19 August 2011 before the episode of "Supertorpe" by Disney Channel, was released the second video for the song "Look at me", sung by Candela Vetrano.

12 September 2011 after the episode of "Supertorpe" by Disney Channel, premiered the third music video of the song "Perfect day", sung by Pablo Martínez.

The 8 November 2011 after the episode of Supertorpe by Disney Channel, premiered the fourth music video of the song "Thank you", sung by Candela Vetrano.

Awards and nominations

International premieres

References

2011 Argentine television series debuts
2010s Argentine comedy television series
Spanish-language television shows
2011 Argentine television series endings
Television series about teenagers